Azerbaijan Technical University (AzTU) is a public university, specialized in engineering, located in Baku, Azerbaijan. The University has 9 schools and 54 departments, 884 faculty members and approximately 6500 students.

History
November 14, 1920, the Soviet government decided that the previous technical school "Baku Polytechnicum" would be closed and replaced by the Baku Polytechnic Institute. The new school focused on training engineers in such sectors as agriculture, civil engineering, electromechanics, economics, and oil. In 1923, the school changed its name to the Azerbaijan Polytechnic Institute. In March 1929 the Communist Party of Azerbaijan decided that the school would be divided into three independent schools covering agriculture, economy, and oil.

However, the growing demands of engineers in other areas outside of oil led to the expansion of the school curriculum, and the school again changed its name in 1934, this time to the Azerbaijan Industrial Institute (AZPI), since it was combined with civil engineering. The Second World War taxed the Soviet Union, and schools like AzPI tried to remain open.

In 1950, the government established a separate Azerbaijan Polytechnic Institute (AzPI) and transferred non-petrochemical curricula to a new school so that Az. I.I. can focus on the oil industry. (AzPI continued to eventually become the Azerbaijan State Oil Academy.) In 1970, the branch of AzPI was established in Ganja.

In 1993, AzPI changed its status and became the Azerbaijan Technical University.

Faculties 
Electrical Engineering and Power Engineering

Transport

Technological Machines

Special equipment and technologies

Radio engineering and communication

Metallurgy

Machine-building

Engineering Business and Management

Dean's Office for International Students

Automation and Computer Technology

Electrical Engineering and Power Engineering 
It was founded in 1964. The faculty includes 4 departments: Thermal and cold technology, Power supply and insulation, Electrical and electrotechnical equipment, Theoretical bases of electrical engineering. Students are attracted to scientific research conducted at the departments.

Transport 
Previously called mechanical. Its modern name was given to the faculty only in 2001.

Technological Machines 
It was founded in 1986 on the basis of the machine-building faculty. 5 departments are part of the faculty: Machine parts and lifting and transporting machines, Metrology and standardization, Theory of mechanisms and machines, Technological complexes and special equipment, Engineering graphics.

Radio engineering and communication 
During the foundation, in 1960, the faculty was called Electrotechnical. Later, the division was carried out, and two faculties were formed: Electro-technical and Radiotechnical.

Metallurgy 
It was founded in February 1964. The faculty includes 4 departments.

Machine-building 
It was founded in 1982. The faculty includes 5 departments: Technology of mechanization, Machine parts, Theory of machines and mechanisms, Technological complexes and special equipment, Physics.

Dean's Office for International Students 
The purpose of training at the faculty is to train personnel for foreign countries. It was founded in 1978.

Automation and Computer Technology 
It was founded in 1960. There are 6 departments at the faculty: Automation of Computational Technologies and Production Processes, Automation and Telemechanics, Industrial Electronics, General and Theoretical Radio Engineering, Higher Mathematics, Physics.

See also 
Baku Polytechnicum

References

External links
Official website  

 
Universities and institutes established in the Soviet Union
Technical universities and colleges in Azerbaijan
Science and technology in Azerbaijan
Educational institutions established in 1950
1950 establishments in the Soviet Union